Miqdadiyah is a city in the Diyala Governorate of Iraq. Its population is a mix of Arabs, Turkmens and Kurds. The city is located about 80 km (50 mi) northeast of Baghdad and 30 km (19 mi) northeast of Baquba.

Etymology 
The alternative name of the town is Shareban or Sharaban, mentioned as such in the works of the classical writers such as Ptolemy and Strabo. Sharaban (from Shahraban, from old Iranian, Shatrapan) transforms into satrap in Greek and means a governor or a governorate. This name is still used locally. As of late, however, the term Muqdadiyah has largely replaced the old name.

The local Shias believe that Muqdadiya is named after Miqdad ibn Aswad Al-Kindi (Arabic: مقداد بن الاسود الكندي) was one of the Sahabah of the Islamic Prophet Muhammad. There is in fact a shrine of Miqdad al-Saiwari in the western suburbs of the present town. Miqdad is venerated by Shi'a Muslims as one of the Four Companions, early Muslims who were followers of Ali ibn Abi Talib. Miqdad ibn Aswad is among Shi'as regarded as one of the most respected Sahaba. He is mentioned in one Hadith regarding the perfect Shia, he was one of the Muhajirun. However, they fail to demonstrate exactly how this town is connected Miqdad ibn Aswad in order to be named after him.

The etymology of the name Miqdad or Muqdadia stands for Persian "Given by the Magi", in the same way as the name Baghdad stands "Given by God".

References

External links
 Iraq Image - Muqdadiyah Satellite Observation

Populated places in Diyala Province
District capitals of Iraq
Cities in Iraq
Turkmen communities in Iraq
Kurdish settlements in Iraq